Nova et Vetera is a theological review in the tradition of Thomism which focuses on contemporary issues facing the Roman Catholic Church. Published in the Swiss region of Romandy, the main language of the journal is French.  It is also published in a distinct English edition founded by Matthew Levering in 2003.  Its current co-editors are Matthew Levering of Mundelein Seminary and Thomas Joseph White of the Pontifical University of St. Thomas Aquinas - Angelicum.  The English edition is currently published by the St. Paul Center for Biblical Theology.

Description
The English edition of Nova et Vetera is published quarterly and provides an international forum for theological and philosophical studies from a Thomistic perspective.  It seeks to be "at the heart of the Church," faithful to the Magisterium and the teachings of the Second Vatican Council, and devoted to the work of true dialogue, both ecumenically and across intellectual disciplines.  Nova et Vetera is a peer-reviewed journal.

The journal was founded in 1926 by future Cardinal Charles Journet in association with Jacques Maritain.

Authors who have published articles in the English edition of Nova et Vetera include a wide variety of eminent scholars such as Robert Barron, John Joy, Richard Bauckham, Romanus Cessario, Georges Cottier, Archbishop Joseph Augustine Di Noia, Cardinal Avery Dulles, Francis George, Richard B. Hays, F. Russell Hittinger, William Kurz, Bruce Marshall, Francis Martin, Frank Matera, Edward T. Oakes, Michele Schumacher, Christopher Seitz, Janet E. Smith, Geoffrey Wainwright, Thomas Weinandy, Robert Louis Wilken, Edward Feser, and Stephen B. Clark, among many others.

References

External links
Official website for French edition
Official website for English edition
St. Paul Center for Biblical Theology

Catholic magazines
Catholic University of America academic journals
Publications established in 1926
Christianity studies journals
Quarterly journals